Ilse Gaste, ; born 21 May 1906, date of death unknown) was a German figure skater. She competed in the mixed pairs event at the 1928 Winter Olympics.

References

External links
 

1906 births
Date of death missing
Place of death missing
Olympic figure skaters of Germany
Figure skaters at the 1928 Winter Olympics
German female pair skaters